Ghofran Zaki (born 30 September 1992) is an Egyptian taekwondo athlete.

He competed at the 2016 Summer Olympics in Rio de Janeiro, in the men's 68 kg.

References

External links

 

1992 births
Living people
Egyptian male taekwondo practitioners
Olympic taekwondo practitioners of Egypt
Taekwondo practitioners at the 2016 Summer Olympics
African Games gold medalists for Egypt
African Games medalists in taekwondo
Competitors at the 2011 All-Africa Games
Competitors at the 2015 African Games
21st-century Egyptian people